Austin House is a national historic site located at 227 Delmar Avenue, Sarasota, Florida in Manatee County.

It was added to the National Register of Historic Places on February 5, 1998.

References

National Register of Historic Places in Manatee County, Florida
Houses on the National Register of Historic Places in Florida